Zhang Wenli (張文禮) (died September 15, 921?), known as Wang Deming (王德明) during the time that he was an adoptive son of Wang Rong, was a Chinese military general and politician who initially served under the late Tang Dynasty warlord Liu Rengong and Liu Rengong's son Liu Shouwen, and later Wang Rong, the only prince of the early Five Dynasties and Ten Kingdoms period state Zhao (also known as Chengde Circuit (成德)).  Wang Rong favored him for his talent and adopted him as a son. However, in 921, he encouraged Wang Rong's guards to mutiny and slaughter the Wang clan.  
He then took over the Zhao lands.  When Wang Rong's ally Li Cunxu the Prince of Jin attacked in response, he died in shock.

Prior to becoming Wang Rong's adoptive son 
It is not known when Zhang Wenli was born, but it is known that he was originally from You Prefecture (幽州, in modern Beijing).  At some point after Liu Rengong, then the military governor (Jiedushi) of Lulong Circuit (盧龍, headquartered at You Prefecture) conquered neighboring Yichang Circuit (義昌, headquartered in modern Cangzhou, Hebei) and made his son Liu Shouwen the military governor of Yichang, he sent Zhang to Yichang to serve under Liu Shouwen.  On an occasion when Liu Shouwen was at You Prefecture to see his father, Zhang took over Yichang's capital Cang Prefecture (滄州) and refused to let Liu Shouwen return.  However, the people of Cang Prefecture then rose against him, causing him to flee to neighboring Chengde Circuit (成德, headquartered in modern Shijiazhuang, Hebei).  Wang Rong, who was then the military governor of Chengde, was impressed by Zhang's speech and Zhang's claims about knowing how to lead an army, so he adopted Zhang as a son and changed his name to Wang Deming, entrusting much of the Chengde military affairs to him.

As Wang Rong's adoptive son 
In 910, Wang Rong, who had by that point been given the title of Prince of Zhao by Zhu Wen (who had taken over the throne from Tang) but who had subsequently come after Later Liang surprise attack, entered into an alliance with Later Liang's archenemy Li Cunxu the Prince of Jin; subsequently, in 911, Jin and Zhao forces defeated the Later Liang army and forced it to withdraw, saving Zhao.  In gratitude, Wang Rong took 37 corps out of his army and put them under Wang Deming's command, sending him to accompany and assist Li Cunxu in his campaigns.

In 912, when Li Cunxu was set to launch a major attack against Liu Rengong's son and successor Liu Shouguang, who had claimed the title of Emperor of Yan, Wang Deming joined forces with Li Cunxu's major general Zhou Dewei, as well as Cheng Yan (程巖), who commanded an army from Jin's and Zhao's ally Yiwu Circuit (義武, headquartered in modern Baoding, Hebei), and they subsequently sieged You Prefecture.  By the end of the year, however, Wang appeared to be no longer participating in the campaign, for he was recorded as taking 30,000 men to raid Later Liang's northern territory and capturing Zongcheng (宗城, in modern Xingtai, Hebei).  However, the Later Liang general Yang Shihou counterattacked and defeated him, killing some 5,000 of his men.

In 913, while Zhou still had Liu Shouguang under siege at You, the new Later Liang emperor Zhu Zhen (Emperor Taizu's son) sent Yang and Liu Shouguang's brother Liu Shouqi (劉守奇, who had submitted to Later Liang) north to attack Zhao, apparently to divert Zhao's and Jin's attention from Liu Shouguang.  When Wang Rong sought aid from Zhou, Zhou sent his officer Li Shaoheng (李紹衡) to join Wang Deming in resisting the Later Liang army.  Subsequently, the Later Liang army left Chengde and headed for Yichang.

By 920, Wang Rong had recalled Wang Deming back to Chengde to command his guard corps, while sending another officer, Fu Xi (符習), to replace him as the commander of the Zhao forces accompanying Li Cunxu.  That year, Wang Rong, who had become accustomed to luxurious living, alienated his army by spending too much time at his vacation home in the mountains west of Zhao's capital Zhen Prefecture (鎮州).  The soldiers mutinied and killed Wang Rong's favorite eunuch Shi Ximeng (石希蒙), and in response, Wang Rong killed the eunuch Li Honggui (李弘規) and the officer Li Ai (李藹), whom he blamed for inciting the mutiny, and slaughtered Li Honggui's and Li Ai's families.  He transferred Li Honggui's and Li Ai's authorities to his son Wang Zhaozuo and Wang Deming.  Wang Rong continued to pursue those whom he considered to be Li Honggui's and Li Ai's associates, and many were killed.  Wang Deming, who by this point had formed the ambition to overthrow his adoptive father, falsely informed the guards that Wang Rong was intending to slaughter them all, causing a general panic in the guard corps.  In spring 921, the guards mutinied and killed Wang Rong.  They offered the leadership of the circuit to Wang Deming.  Wang Deming accepted, and changed his name back to Zhang Wenli.  He then slaughtered Wang Rong's clan, sparing only Wang Zhaozuo's wife (who was a sister of Zhu Zhen's and who carried the Later Liang title of Princess Puning), hoping that this would open the possibility of Later Liang assistance.

Rule of Chengde Circuit 
Zhang Wenli sent a report of what occurred to Li Cunxu, requesting to be commissioned as a military governor, while at the same time offering to support him as emperor.  (Li Cunxu had, up to that point, only carried the title of Prince of Jin as he theoretically still considered himself a Tang subject.)  Li Cunxu's initial instinct was to attack Zhang for his killing of the Wang clan, but Li Cunxu's staff members thought that as Jin was locked in a struggle with Later Liang at that point, it should not create another enemy.  Li Cunxu thus commissioned Zhang as the acting military governor.

However, Zhang was fearful that the Jin prince would eventually attack him.  He thus repeatedly sent secret messengers to both Zhu Zhen and the Khitan Emperor Taizu.  (Zhu Zhen, despite the urging of his chancellor Jing Xiang, took no action, believing that Zhang was not truly a trustworthy subject.)  Many of these secret messengers were, however, intercepted by Jin forces.  Li Cunxu released the secret messengers back to Zhang, further increasing Zhang's fear about what Li Cunxu might do next.  He was also fearful that the senior officers of Zhao might rebel against him, and often found excuses to kill them.  He tried to appease Fu Xi by promoting Fu Xi's son Fu Zimeng (符子蒙), while recalling Fu Xi back to Chengde.  Fu, instead, met with Li Cunxu, urging Li Cunxu to avenge Wang Rong.

In fall 921, Li Cunxu commissioned Fu as the acting military governor of Chengde and launched a general campaign against Zhang.  He sent his generals Yan Bao (閻寶) and Shi Jiantang (史建瑭) to assist Fu.  Together, the Jin troops and Fu's Zhao troops attacked Chengde's Zhao Prefecture (趙州, in modern Shijiazhuang).  Zhao Prefecture's prefect Wang Ting (王鋌) surrendered quickly.  Upon hearing the fall of Zhao Prefecture, Zhang, who was then suffering from an abdominal illness, died in shock.  His son Zhang Chujin took over command of the Chengde forces, but was eventually defeated and killed by Li Cunxu in 922.  Li Cunxu took over the former Zhao territory.  He had Zhang Wenli's body cut in pieces in public.

Notes and references 

 New History of the Five Dynasties, vol. 39.
 Zizhi Tongjian, vols. 267, 268, 269, 271.

9th-century births
921 deaths
Five Dynasties and Ten Kingdoms generals
Generals from Beijing
Jin (Later Tang precursor) people born during Tang
Politicians from Beijing
Year of birth unknown
Zhao (Five Dynasties period) people born during Tang